Five Easy Hot Dogs is the fifth studio album by Canadian musician Mac DeMarco. A departure from the  previous studio albums in DeMarco's discography, the album is entirely instrumental and was recorded during a road trip from Los Angeles to New York. it was announced on January 4, 2023 and released on January 20.

Critical reception 

The album received "generally favorable reviews", according to the review aggregator Metacritic.

Track listing

Charts

References 

2023 albums
Mac DeMarco albums
Instrumental albums